Kawachi Bankan (Citrus kawachiensis), also called Mishokan and Uwa Gold, is a Citrus hybrid cultivated for its edible fruit.

Genetics
Two varieties of Kawachi Bankan have been identified: one, a hybrid between the ujukitsu (seed parent, Citrus ujukitsu) and an unidentified species (pollen parent), and the other, a hybrid between the yuge-hyoukan (seed parent, Citrus yuge-hyokan) and an unidentified species (pollen parent).

Distribution
It originated and is grown in Japan and is also grown in the United States.

Description
The Kawachi Bankan was first discovered in Kumamoto Prefecture in 1910. Since the 1980s, the acreage growing this fruit has been increasing. The fruits are large, normally weighing 0.6-1.1 pounds (300-500 grams) and are slightly conical in shape, with most having a nipple at the stem end. They contain few seeds. The rind is thick, somewhat pebbly, and yellow in color; the flesh is also yellow. The flavor is sweet and slightly acidic, and is very juicy. The tree is densely branched and the leaves are elliptic in shape. The fruit matures late and is shipped at the end of May in Japan.

Chemistry
The peel of the Kawachi Bankan fruit contains many biologically active substances including naringin, narirutin, auraptene, and 3,5,6,7,8,3',4'-heptamethoxyflavone. The dried powder of the peel exerts anti-inflammatory and neuroprotective effects against aging in the brain of mice and ameliorates microglial activation, tau hyperphosphorylation, and suppression of neurogenesis in the hippocampus of senescence-accelerated mice. It also ameliorates DSS-induced body weight loss, colon shortening, increased expression of pro-inflammatory cytokines, and decreased expression of colonic tight junctions in colitic mice.

Confectionery products
A limited-edition flavor of the Japanese candy Hi-Chew is based on the Kawachi Bankan fruit.

Availability
It is no longer commercially available in the United States but is sold in Japan.

See also
List of citrus fruits
Japanese citrus

References

Citrus
Citrus hybrids
Fruit trees
Edible fruits
Japanese fruit
Fruits originating in East Asia
Flora of Japan